Charlie Ragle (born May 30, 1976) is an American football coach and former player, currently the assistant head coach and special teams coordinator at Arizona State University in the Pac-12 Conference. He was previously the head coach at Idaho State University in 2022, and the special teams coordinator at California and Arizona. Prior to joining the collegiate coaching ranks, Ragle had a highly successful run as a high school coach in Arizona.

Playing career
Born in Playas, New Mexico, Ragle was a two-time all-state selection at running back for Animas High School in New Mexico and played college football at Eastern New Mexico University in Portales. He was a three-year starter at running back for the Division II Greyhounds, and also returned kicks.

Coaching career

High school
From 2000 to 2004, Ragle served as the defensive coordinator at Moon Valley High School in Phoenix, Arizona. Moon Valley made the state playoffs in the final three years, and in 2004, they finished with a 14–0 record as state champions. In early 2005 Ragle and offensive coordinator Dave Huffine departed Moon Valley to join Ron Estabrook's staff at powerhouse Chaparral High School in Scottsdale, Arizona.

After a stop as a graduate assistant for Arizona State in 2006 under Dirk Koetter, Ragle returned to the high school ranks as the head coach at Chaparral, following Estabrook's retirement. In five seasons, from 2007 to 2011, Ragle led his team to a 63–7 overall record, and won state championships in his final three seasons. Among his players at Chaparral was future NFL Pro Bowl offensive tackle Taylor Lewan. Lewan would be recruited by then-University of Michigan head coach Rich Rodriguez, and Rodriguez and Ragle became acquainted.

Arizona
Rodriguez hired Ragle prior to the 2012 season to serve as Arizona's assistant director of operations. He was promoted to special teams coordinator and tight ends coach in December 2012, a position he held through 2016 season.

California
Prior to the 2017 season, Ragle was hired by head coach Justin Wilcox as the special teams coordinator and tight ends coach at California. In 2019, he began to focus solely on special teams, and stayed in Berkeley through 2021.

Idaho State
In December 2021, Ragle was hired to succeed Rob Phenicie as the head coach at Idaho State University in the Big Sky Conference. It was his first opportunity as a collegiate head coach. Following a frustrating 1–10 first season in Pocatello, Ragle resigned in late November to join the staff at Arizona State.

Arizona State
Following the 2022 season, Ragle joined Kenny Dillingham's inaugural staff at Arizona State; he had coached Dillingham in high school. Ragle will serve as the assistant head coach and special teams coordinator.

Head coaching record

Personal life
Ragle graduated from Eastern New Mexico University in 1998 with a degree in physical education, with a minor in history. He and his wife, Carrie, have a daughter, Caylee, and a son, Chas.

References

1976 births
Living people
American football running backs
Arizona Wildcats football coaches
California Golden Bears football coaches
Eastern New Mexico Greyhounds football players
Idaho State Bengals football coaches
High school football coaches in Arizona
People from Hidalgo County, New Mexico
Coaches of American football from New Mexico
Players of American football from New Mexico